The following lists events that happened in 2013 in Nigeria.

Incumbents

Federal government
 President: Goodluck Jonathan (PDP)
 Vice President: Namadi Sambo (PDP)
 Senate President: David Mark (PDP)
 House Speaker: Aminu Waziri Tambuwal (PDP)
 Chief Justice: Aloma Mariam Mukhtar

Governors

 Rivers State: Chibuike Amaechi (PDP)

Events

January
 1 January - Nigeria's military kill 13 members of the Islamist militant group Boko Haram and lose one soldier in a gun battle in Maiduguri.
 4 January - The Nigerian police announces that Hyundai has paid a ransom of £118,000 ($190,000) to free 6 kidnapped workers in the Niger Delta region.
 23 January - Nigerian Sharia conflict
 Gunmen from the Islamist extremist group Boko Haram open fire at a market in Damboa, killing 18 people.
 Five people are hacked to death in Maiduguri by members of the Islamist sect Boko Haram.
 30 January - A Dutch court rules that Royal Dutch Shell can be held partially responsible for pollution in the Niger Delta in southern Nigeria.
 31 January - Presence of an explosion which is deemed Muslim extremists are responsible for the attack. This attack took the lives of 1,000 people and numerous injuries took place.

February
 1 February - The Nigerian Army suspected terrorist camp used by Boko Haram killing 18 members and capturing large amounts ammunition, guns and weapons.
 6 February - The All Progressives Congress (APC) was founded from a merger of Nigeria's three largest opposition parties - the Action Congress of Nigeria (ACN), the Congress for Progressive Change (CPC), the All Nigeria Peoples Party (ANPP), a faction of the All Progressives Grand Alliance (APGA) and the new PDP - a faction of then ruling People's Democratic Party.
 8 February - Nine women are shot to death in Kano. According to reports, all of them were involved in a polio vaccination policy and were most probably killed by the Islamist movement Boko Haram, which has previously threatened to target those involved in vaccinations.
 10 February - Suspected Boko Haram militants kill three doctors in the northeastern Nigerian region of Yobe. Their nationality is disputed, with reports suggesting they are South Korean, North Korean or Chinese.
 17 February - Six foreign workers, which includes one Italian, one Greek and two Lebanese, are kidnapped in a construction site and one security guard is killed.
 19 February - Seven French tourists are kidnapped by gunmen near Waza National Park in northern Cameroon, near the border with Nigeria. President of France François Hollande states that the Islamist group Boko Haram may be responsible.
 24 February - At least six people die in an attack in Ngalda, Yobe State.
 26 February - Gunmen kill seven guards guarding a marketplace in Yobe State.

March
 5 March - Gunmen killed eight people in an attack on a police station and a bank in northeastern Nigeria.
 9 March - Nigerian militant group Ansaru announced that it has killed seven foreigners that were being held hostage.
 10 March - Nigerian militants belonging to Ansar al-Muslimeen claimed the responsibility to kidnapping and killing Italian, Greek, and British construction workers in Northern Nigeria.
 13 March - Men on motorbikes storm a primary school and open fire wounding four teachers.
 18 March - A series of explosions killed approx 25 people in a bus park in Kano.
 21 March - At least 45 people drown and 60 are missing after a boat carrying Nigerian migrants capsizes and sinks off shore from Libreville, Gabon.
 24 March - 25 people are killed in coordinated attacks by unidentified men armed with machine guns, bombs and rocket-propelled grenades in Northern Nigeria Adamawa State.
 26 March - A court in South Africa sentences Nigerian militant Henry Okah to 24 years' imprisonment for his involvement in the Abuja car bombings which killed at least 12 people in October 2010.
 31 March - The Nigerian Army kills 14 suspected Boko Haram members in a raid on a building, with the death of one soldier and the capture of a potential suicide bomber in a car full of explosives in the northern city of Kano.

April

May

June

July

August

September

October

November

December

Deaths

March
 March 21 - Chinua Achebe

References

 
Nigeria
2010s in Nigeria
Years of the 21st century in Nigeria
Nigeria